The Diocese of Nîmes (Latin: Dioecesis Nemausensis; French: Diocèse de Nîmes) is a diocese of the Latin Church of the Catholic Church in France. The diocese comprises all of the department of Gard. It is a suffragan of the Diocese of Avignon.

By the Concordat of 1801 the territory of Diocese of Nîmes was united to that of the Diocese of Avignon. It was re-established as a separate diocese in 1821 and a Brief of 27 April 1877, granted its bishops the right to add Alais (the modern Alès) and Uzès to their episcopal style, these two dioceses being now combined with that of Nîmes. Therefore, the formal name is he Diocese of Nîmes (–Uzès and Alès) (Latin: Dioecesis Nemausensis (–Uticensis et Alesiensis); French: Diocèse de Nîmes (–Uzès et Alès)).

History

Nîmes (Latin: Nemausus) was an important city in Roman antiquity. The Pont du Gard is not far away.

Late and rather contradictory traditions attribute the foundation of the Church of Nîmes either to Celidonius, the man "who was blind from his birth" of the Gospel, or to St. Honestus, the apostle of Navarre, said to have been sent to southern France by St. Peter, with St. Saturninus (Sernin), the apostle of Toulouse. The true apostle of Nîmes was St. Baudilus, whose martyrdom is placed by some at the end of the 3rd century, and by others at the end of the fourth. Many writers affirm that a certain St. Felix, martyred by the Vandals about 407, was Bishop of Nîmes, but Louis Duchesne questions this.

There was a see at Nîmes at least as early as 396, for in that year a synodical letter was sent by a Council of Nîmes to the bishops of Gaul.

Bishops
The first bishop whose date is positively known is Sedatus, present at the Council of Agde in 506.

Other noteworthy bishops are:

St. John (about 511, before 526);
St. Remessarius (633–640);
Bertrand of Languissel (1280–1324), faithful to Boniface VIII, and for that reason driven from his see for a year by Philip the Fair;
Cardinal Guillaume d'Estouteville (1441–1449);
Cardinal Guillaume Briçonnet (1496–1514);
the famous pulpit orator Esprit Fléchier (1687–1710);
the distinguished polemist Claude-Henri Plantier (1855–1875) whose 1873 pastoral letter provoked a protest from the German Chancellor Bismarck;
the preacher François-Nicolas Besson (1875–1888).

Urban II, coming to France to preach the crusade, consecrated the Cathedral of Nîmes in 1096 and presided over a council. Pope Alexander III visited Nîmes in 1162. Clement IV (1265–1268), born at Saint Gilles, in this diocese, granted the monastery of that town numerous favors.

St. Louis, who embarked at Aigues-Mortes for his two crusades, surrounded Nîmes with walls. In 1305, Clement V passed through the city on his way to Lyon to be crowned. In consequence of disputes about the sale of grapes to the papal household, Innocent VI laid an interdict on Nîmes in 1358.

The diocese was greatly disturbed by the Wars of Religion: on 29 Sept., 1567, five years before the Massacre of St. Bartholomew, the Protestants of Nîmes carried out the massacre of Catholics known in French history as the Michelade. Louis XIII of France at Nîmes issued the decree of religious pacification known as the Peace of Nîmes.

To 1000

 1st century Celidonius (legendary)
 374–407 Saint Felix
 506–510 Sedatus.
c. 520 Johannes I.
 589 Pélage
 John of Nimes  511–626
 633–640 Remessarius
c. 650 Johannes II.
 672–675 Aréjius
 680 Crocus
 737 Palladius
c. 745 Gregorius
 784–788 Sesnandus
 791–798 Vintering
 808–850 Christiaus
 858–860 Isnardus
 867 Anglard I.
 870–890 Gilbert
 895–905 Anglard II.
 905–928 Hubert
 929–941 Rainard
 943 Bernard I.
 943–946 Bégon
 947–986 Bernard d'Anduze
 987–1016 Frotaire I.

1000 to 1300

 1016–1026 Geraldus d'Anduze
 1027–1077 Frotaire II.
 1066–1084 Eléfant (coadjutor)
 1080–1090 Pierre I. Ermangaud
 1095–1097 Bertrand I. de Montredon
 1097–1112 Raymond I. Guillaume
 1113–1134 Jean III.
 1134–1141 Guillaume I.
 1141–1180 Aldebert d'Uzès et de Posquières
 1181–1207 Guillaume II. d'Uzès
 1207–1209 Hugues de Lédignan
 1210 Rodolfe
 1212–1242 Arnaud
 1242–1272 Raymond Amauri
 1272–1280 Pierre Gaucelme
 1280–1324 Bertrand de Languissel

1300 to 1500

 1324 Armand de Vernon
 1324 Bernard III.
 1324–1331 Bernard IV.
 1331–1337 Guirald de Languissel
 1337 Guillaume Curti
 1337–1342 Aimeric Girard
 1342–1348 Bertrand de Deaux
 1348–1361 Jean de Blauzac
 1361–1362 Paul de Deaux
 1362 Jacques I. de Deaux
 1362–1367 Gaucelme de Deaux
 1367–1372 Jean V. de Gase
 1372–1380 Jean IV. d'Uzès
 1380–1383 Seguin d'Authon
 1383–1391 Bernard IV. de Bonneval
 1391–1393 Pierre III. Girard (Administrator)
 1393–1426 Gilles de Lascours
 1420–1429 Nicolas Habert
 1429–1438 Léonard Delphini
 1438–1441 Guillaume IV. de Champeaux
 1441–1449 Guillaume d'Estouteville (administrator)
 1450–1453 Geoffroy Soreau
 1453–1458 Alain de Coëtivy
 1460–1481 Robert de Villequier
 1481–1482 Etienne de Blosset
 1482–1496 Jacques II. de Caulers
 1496–1514 Guillaume Briçonnet

1500-1800

 1515–1554 Michel Briçonnet
 1554–1561 Claude I. Briçonnet
 1561–1568 Bernard VI. d'Elbène
 1573–1594 Raymond III. Cavalésy
 1598–1625 Pierre IV. de Valernod
 1625–1633 Claude II. de Saint-Bonnet de Thoiras
 1633–1644 Anthime Denis Cohon
 1644–1655 Hector d'Ouvrier
 1655–1670 Anthime Denis Cohon (second time)
 1671–1689 Jean-Jacques III. Séguier de la Verrière
 1692–1710 Esprit Fléchier
 1710–1736 Jean VII. César Rousseau de la Parisière
 1737–1784 Charles Prudent de Becdelièvre
 1784–1801 Pierre V. Marie-Magdeleine Cortois de Balore

From 1800
 1821–1837 Claude de Chaffoy
 1838–1855 Jean-François-Marie Cart
 1855–1875 Claude-Henri Plantier
 1875–1888 Louis Besson
 1889–1896 Alfred Gilly
 1896–1921 Félix Béguinot
 1921–1924 Marcellin Charles Marty
 1924–1963 Jean Girbeau
 1963–1977 Pierre-Marie Rougé
 1978–1999 Jean Cadilhac
 2001–2021 Robert Wattebled
 2021–present Nicolas Brouwet

Pilgrimages and saints

The chief pilgrimages of the present Diocese of Nîmes are: Notre Dame de Grâce, Rochefort, dating from Charlemagne, and commemorating a victory over Muslim forces. Louis XIV and his mother, Anne of Austria, established here a foundation for perpetual Masses.
Notre Dame de Grâce, Laval, in the vicinity of Alais, dating from not later than 900.
Notre Dame de Bon Secours de Prime Combe, Fontanès, since 887.
Notre Dame de Bonheur, founded 1045 on the mountain of l'Aigoual in the vicinity of Valleraugues.
Notre Dame de Belvezet, a shrine of the 11th century, on Mont Andavu.
Notre Dame de Vauvert, whither the converted Albigenses were sent, often visited by St. Louis, Clement V, and Francis I.
The shrine of St. Vérédème, a hermit who died Archbishop of Avignon, and of the martyr St. Baudilus, at Trois Fontaines and at Valsainte near Nîmes.

The following Saints are especially venerated in the present Diocese of Nîmes: St. Castor, Bishop of Apt (4th to 5th century), a native of Nîmes; the priest St. Theodoritus, martyr, patron saint of the town of Uzès; the Athenian St. Giles (AEgidius, seventh cent.), living as a recluse near Uzès when he was accidentally wounded by King Childeric, later abbot of the monastery built by Childeric in reparation for this accident, venerated also in England; Blessed Peter of Luxemburg who made a sojourn in the diocese, at Villeneuve-lès-Avignon (1369–87); Ste. Artimidora, whose relic are in Aimargues church.

See also
 Catholic Church in France

References

Bibliography

Reference works

 pp. 573–575. (Use with caution; obsolete)
  (in Latin) pp. 329–330.
 (in Latin) p. 187.
 p. 237-238.
 pp. 234.
 pp. 260.
 p. 280.

Studies

 second edition (in French)

External links
  Centre national des Archives de l'Église de France, L’Épiscopat francais depuis 1919, retrieved: 2016-12-24.
Goyau, G. (1911). "Nîmes". In The Catholic Encyclopedia. New York: Robert Appleton Company. Retrieved: 2016-07-27.  
 Diocese of NÎmes:  Diocesan history

Acknowledgment

Nimes
Nimes
Nimes
1821 establishments in France